Francis Mather Bixby (December 20, 1828  March 4, 1905) was an American politician from New York.

Life
He was the son of Ira Bixby (1803–1835) and Caroline (Mather) Bixby (1807–1890), a sister of Canal Commissioner John C. Mather (1813–1882).

Bixby was a member of the New York State Senate (8th D.) in 1876 and 1877.

He was again a member of the State Senate (9th D.) in 1880 and 1881.

He died on March 4, 1905.

Sources
 Civil List and Constitutional History of the Colony and State of New York compiled by Edgar Albert Werner (1884; pg. 291)
 OBITUARY; CAROLINE M. BIXBY in NYT on November 13, 1890
 Mather genealogy

References

1828 births
1905 deaths
Democratic Party New York (state) state senators
Politicians from New York City